Seddik Majeri (born 31 May 1994) is a Tunisian footballer who currently plays as a defender for US Ben Guerdane.

References

External links
 

1994 births
Living people
Tunisian footballers
Tunisian expatriate footballers
Espérance Sportive de Tunis players
AS Djerba players
CA Bizertin players
Al Batin FC players
Olympique Béja players
US Ben Guerdane players
Tunisian Ligue Professionnelle 1 players
Saudi First Division League players
Expatriate footballers in Saudi Arabia
Tunisian expatriate sportspeople in Saudi Arabia
Association football defenders